Family is a 2012 South Korean family sitcom starring Hwang Shin-hye, Ahn Suk-hwan, Park Ji-yoon and Park Hee-von. It aired on KBS2 from August 13, 2012 to February 6, 2013, on Mondays to Fridays at 19:45 for 120 episodes.

Also known under its previous title Shut Up Family.

Plot
Woo Shin-hye is a divorcee who lives with her vain mother and two beautiful daughters, the older one who cares deeply about her image but is secretly a slob and the younger is intelligent and seemingly kind but has the sly and cruel personality. They are filthy rich thanks to Shin-hye's beauty salon. Yeol Suk-hwan is a widowed and enthusiastic single father who works at a Youth Centre to support his poor family. He lives with his greedy but kind mother-in-law and three children—two sons, the oldest who is a bread errand boy and is bullied in school and the youngest is an innocent but slow child. as well as a smart, strong but homely daughter which others mistake her as an older woman.

Shin-hye and Suk-hwan unexpectedly fall in love and marry. Now that the two families live under the same roof, conflicts constantly arise due to differences in personalities and lifestyle. However, they work their problems together and help each other out, successfully or not, and they eventually become a real family.

Cast
Woo family
 Hwang Shin-hye as Woo Shin-hye
 Park Ji-yoon as Woo Ji-yoon
 Kim Da-som as Woo Da-yoon
 Sunwoo Yong-nyeo as Na Il-ran
 Lee Bon as Woo Bon

Yeol family
 Ahn Suk-hwan as Yeol Suk-hwan
 Park Hee-von as Yeol Hee-bong
 Choi Woo-shik as Yeol Woo-bong
 Kim Dan-yool as Yeol Mak-bong
 Nam Neung-mi as Goong Ae-ja
 Kim Hyung-beom as Yeol Hyung-beom

E Coffee
 Shim Ji-ho as Cha Ji-ho
 Min Chan-gi as Al
 Park Seo-joon as Cha Seo-joon

Extended cast
 Park Sung-kwang as Goong Sang-in
 Kim Dong-beom as Bin Dae-chul
 Wang Ji-won as instructor
 Choi Ha-na as Choi Ha-na
 Han Yeo-wool as Han Yeo-wool
 Joo Young-ho as Joo Young-ho

Cameo appearance
 Kim Won-hyo as aesthetic goose customer couple
 Shin Jin-hwa as aesthetic goose customer couple
 Jung Kyung-mi as Mak-bong's homeroom teacher
 Shin Bo-ra as drunk and crazy fan of Hyung-beom's
 Yoon Bo-ra as herself
 Bang Min-ah as a character in Woo-bong's fan fiction novel
 Yura as a character in Woo-bong's fan fiction novel
 Choi Ah-ra as Shin Jang-mi
 Kim Jae-kyung as Yoon Yoo-mi
 Ji Soo as Han Song-yi
 Jo Kwan-woo as Shin-hye's ex-husband
 Park Hwi-soon as university group senior
 Song Ji-eun as high school girl stalker
 K.Will as Roy Kwak
 Jeong Ga-eun as Mi-ja
 Gong Hyun-joo as Lee Hee-jae
 Jeong Jin-woon as Kang Dong-won
 Si-hwan as Seo-joon's classmate

Awards
 2012 K-Drama Star Awards: Best Comic Acting - Ahn Suk-hwan
 2012 KBS Entertainment Awards: Excellence Award, Female Performer in a Variety Show - Hwang Shin-hye

References

External links
 Family official KBS website 

Korean Broadcasting System television dramas
2012 South Korean television series debuts
2013 South Korean television series endings
Korean-language television shows
South Korean television sitcoms
South Korean romantic comedy television series
Television series about families